Gyrate is the debut studio album by American rock band Pylon, released in 1980 by record label DB.

In a 1981 Trouser Press Review of Gyrate, Jon Young noted the album had "forceful rhythms and a kooky aura...jagged broken-glass textures and earnestly overbearing lyrics." He said the band has a "nervous, paranoid vibe," similar to the early Talking Heads. Young concludes, "Pylon prods and prods and prods."

Track listing
All songs written and arranged by Pylon, except where noted (Copyright Watteau Music).

Side A
"Volume" – 4:10
"Feast on My Heart" – 3:28 (Pylon, with additional lyrics by Craig Woodall)
"Precaution" – 2:45
"Weather Radio" – 2:08
"The Human Body" – 3:00
"Read a Book" – 1:55

Side B
"Driving School" – 3:47†
"Gravity" – 2:31
"Danger" – 5:32
"Working Is No Problem" – 3:24
"Stop It" – 2:59

† The original DB Records pressing of the LP in 1980 opened with the tune "Driving School" on Side B; The 1988 DB Records reissue removed the song, replacing it with "Recent Title". Later reissue versions, such as the CD below, featured both tunes.

Gyrate Plus – 2007 reissue
"Cool" – 3:21
"Dub" – 4:42
"Volume" – 4:17
"Feast on My Heart" – 3:34
"Precaution" – 2:52
"Weather Radio" – 2:15
"Human Body" – 3:07
"Read a Book" – 2:00
"Driving School" – 3:54
"Recent Title" – 2:27
"Gravity" – 2:39
"Danger" – 5:39
"Working Is No Problem" – 3:32
"Stop It" – 3:05
"Danger!!" – 5:40
"Functionality" – 4:29

 Tracks 1 and 2 are from the "Cool"/"Dub" single released in 1979; tracks 3 to 14 from Gyrate; track 15 from 10-inch 45 RPM released in UK and as a 12-inch EP in the US and Italy in 1980; track 16 is a studio demo previously unreleased.

Personnel
Vanessa Ellison – vocals
Randy Bewley – guitar
Michael Lachowski – bass
Curtis Crowe – drums

References

External links
 

1980 debut albums
Pylon (band) albums
DB Records albums